is a Prefectural Natural Park in Iwate Prefecture, Japan. Established in 1961, the park spans the municipalities of Kuji and Kuzumaki.

See also
 National Parks of Japan
 Kuji River (Iwate)

References

External links
 Map of Kuji-Hiraniwa Prefectural Natural Park (Kuji area) 
 Map of Kuji-Hiraniwa Prefectural Natural Park (Hiraniwa area) 
Kuij Tourist Information Site on Hiraniwa 

Parks and gardens in Iwate Prefecture
Protected areas established in 1961
1961 establishments in Japan
Kuji, Iwate
Kuzumaki, Iwate